Fernando Nascimento Cosme (born 1 July 1983), better known as Fernandinho, is a Brazilian futsal player who last played for Kazakhstan club Kairat and the Brazil national team.

Honours
Dinamo Moskva
Russian Futsal Super League: 2010–11, 2011–12, 2012–13, 2015–16, 2016–17
Joinville Futsal
Liga Futsal: 2017
Benfica
Campeonato Nacional: 2018–19
Taça da Liga: 2017–18, 2018–19, 2019–20
Kairat
Kazakhstani Futsal Championship: 2020–21, 2021–22
International
FIFA Futsal World Cup: 2012

References

External links
FIFA profile
Futsalplanet profile
Dinamo Moscow profile

1983 births
Living people
Sportspeople from São Paulo
Brazilian men's futsal players
Azkar Lugo FS players
MFK Dinamo Moskva players
S.L. Benfica futsal players
Brazilian expatriate sportspeople in Spain
Brazilian expatriate sportspeople in Russia
Brazilian expatriate sportspeople in Portugal